Osteochilus lini is a freshwater fish from Southeast Asia. It is found in the lower Mekong River basin, the Chao Phraya River basin, and some coastal drainages; it occurs in Laos, Vietnam, Cambodia, and Thailand. Its common name is dusky face carp.

Osteochilus lini grows to  SL. It inhabits marshlands and swamps, but also uses streams and river as passage routes, and can move into flooded forests and fields. It is locally common in the Mekong basin and captured as a foodfish, together with the very common Osteochilus vittatus.

Named in honor of ichthyologist Lin Shu-Yen (1903-1974).

References

Osteochilus
Fish of the Mekong Basin
Fish of Cambodia
Fish of Laos
Fish of Thailand
Fish of Vietnam
Taxa named by Henry Weed Fowler
Fish described in 1935